The strada statale 163 Amalfitana, also known as Amalfi Drive,  is a road which runs along the stretch of the Amalfi Coast between the southern Italian towns of Sorrento and Amalfi. The road was originally built by the Romans.

For the greater part of its route, the road is carved out of the side of the coastal cliffs, giving views down to the Tyrrhenian Sea and on the other side up to the cliffs above. The road passes through the village of Positano, which is built on the side of the hill. Both the village and the whole drive are tourist attractions in the area.

Amalfi Coast
Roads in Italy
Transport in Campania
Geography of the Metropolitan City of Naples
Province of Salerno
Sorrento
Tourist attractions in Campania
163